Minuscule 349 (in the Gregory-Aland numbering), ε 413 (Soden), is a Greek minuscule manuscript of the New Testament, on paper. It is dated by a colophon to the year 1322. 
It has marginalia.

Description 

The codex contains a complete text of the four Gospels on 399 paper leaves. The text is written in one column per page, in 14-25 lines per page.

There is also a division according to the smaller Ammonian Sections (in Mark 234 Sections, the last in 16:9), without references to the Eusebian Canons.

It contains the Synaxarion, Menologion, subscriptions at the end of each Gospel, Verses (later hand), and pictures.

Text 

The Greek text of the codex is a representative of the Byzantine text-type. It is a member of the textual family 1424. Aland did not place it in any Category.
According to the Claremont Profile Method it creates textual cluster 349 and textual pair with minuscule 2388.

History 

The manuscript was bought in Corfu. It was examined by Scholz and Burgon. It was added to the list of New Testament manuscripts by Scholz (1794-1852).
C. R. Gregory saw it in 1868.

The manuscript is currently housed at the Biblioteca Ambrosiana (F. 61 sup.) in Milan.

See also 

 List of New Testament minuscules
 Biblical manuscript
 Textual criticism

References

Further reading 

 J. M. A. Scholz, Biblisch-kritische Reise (Leipzig, 1823), p. 70-73.
 Catalogus graecorum Bibliothecace Ambrosianae (Mediolani 1906), vol. I, pp. 394–395.

External links 

 Minuscule 349 at the Encyclopedia of Textual Criticism

Greek New Testament minuscules
14th-century biblical manuscripts
Manuscripts of the Ambrosiana collections